National Highway 354B, commonly referred to as NH 354B, is a national highway in  India. It is a spur road of National Highway 54 in the state of Punjab in India.

This highway was removed from the list of national highways on 27 February 2018 and got absorbed in Punjab State Highway 20. Subsequently, on 21 January 2019, another highway was designated as 354B. This starts from its junction with NH-354 near Dera Baba Nanak and terminates at Indo-Pak border in the State of Punjab.

Route 
Dera Baba Nanak to Indo-Pak Border, connecting with the Kartarpur Corridor on the other side.

Junctions  

   near Dera Baba Nanak

See also 
 List of National Highways in India
 List of National Highways in Punjab, India
 List of National Highways in India by state

References

External links 
 NH 354B on OpenStreetMap

National highways in India
National Highways in Punjab, India